Creighton may refer to:
Creighton, Simcoe County, Ontario, a township
Creighton Mine, Ontario or Creighton, a ghost town

See also
Creighton (disambiguation)